The 2014–15 Ohio Bobcats men's basketball team represented Ohio University during the 2014–15 NCAA Division I men's basketball season. It was the first year for Saul Phillips as head coach for the program. The team played its home games at the Convocation Center in Athens, Ohio as a member of the Mid-American Conference.  They finished the season 10–20, 5–13 in MAC play to finish in last place in the East Division. They lost in the first round of the MAC tournament to Western Michigan.

Previous season

The Bobcats finished the 2013–14 season 25–12, 11–7 in MAC play to finish in third place in the East Division. They advanced to the quarterfinals of the MAC tournament where they lost to Akron. They were invited to the CollegeInsider.com Tournament(CIT) where they defeated Cleveland State and Wright State to advance to the quarterfinals where they lost to VMI.

Off season

Jim Christian resigned from Ohio to coach for the Boston College Eagles on April 3, 2014. Ohio University Director of Athletics Jim Schaus introduced Saul Phillips as the new head coach for the Bobcats three days later on April 6, 2014.

Phillips announced on May 7, 2014 that the coaching staff will include former NDSU assistants Will Ryan and Jason Kemp. Aaron Fuss(assistant under former head coach Christian) will remain with the Bobcats as an assistant under Phillips as well.

Freshman Jaaron Simmons transferred from the University of Houston. Because of NCAA transfer rules, Simmons will be forced to sit out the 2014–15 season but will have 3 years of eligibility starting the following season.

Departures

Recruits

Roster

}

Preseason
The preseason poll and league awards were announced by the league office on October 28, 2014. Ohio was picked to finish second in the MAC East

Preseason men's basketball poll
(First place votes in parenthesis)

East Division
 Akron 117 (17)
 Ohio (2)
 Kent State 66
 Buffalo 58
 Bowling Green 52 (1)
 Miami 35

West Division
 Toledo 118 (18)
 Western Michigan 94 (1)
 Eastern Michigan 68
 Northern Illinois 63
 Central Michigan 49 (1)
 Ball State 28

Tournament champs
Toledo (15), Akron (1), Bowling Green (1), Central Michigan (1), Ohio (1), Western Michigan (1)

Preseason All-MAC 

Source

Schedule

|-
!colspan=9 style=|  Exhibition

|-
!colspan=9 style=| Regular Season

|-
!colspan=9 style=| MAC regular season

|-
!colspan=9 style=|MAC Tournament

Statistics

Team Statistics
Final 2014–15 Statistics

Source

Player statistics

Source

Awards and honors

All-MAC Awards 

Source

See also
2014–15 Ohio Bobcats women's basketball team

References

Ohio
Ohio Bobcats men's basketball seasons
Ohio Bobcats men's basketball
Ohio Bobcats men's basketball